Kyriakos Ioannou (born 26 July 1984) is a Cypriot high jumper. He has twice won medals at the World Championships in Athletics (2007 and 2009) and was the bronze medallist at the IAAF World Indoor Championships in 2008. He is the only medalist for Cyprus at the World Athletics Championships since its creation in 1983. He's also the Cypriot record holder, both outdoors (2.35 m) and indoors (2.32 m). Ioannou is a two-time medallist at the Commonwealth Games (2006 and 2014) and took back-to-back gold medals at the Mediterranean Games in 2005 and 2009.

Career
His personal best jump and Cypriot national record is 2.35 metres, achieved at the 2007 World Championships held in Osaka where he won the bronze medal. He became the first World Championships medalist from Cyprus.  Two years later, at the 2009 World Championships in Berlin, he won the silver medal (2,32 m), only beaten by Yaroslav Rybakov. He also took the bronze medal at the 2008 World Indoor Championships and finished fourth two years later at the same competition in Doha.

His best jump, outdoors in 2010, came at Lausanne on July 8, when he took third place with a jump of 2.30. Ioannou began his outdoor season at the first 2011 IAAF Diamond League meet in Doha and set a joint meeting record of 2.33 m alongside American Jesse Williams, though Williams was declared the winner on countback.

Injured, he didn't come in the qualifying rounds at the World Championships in Daegu where he was one of the favourites for a medal.

In 2012, still injured, he arrived to qualifying to the Olympic final in London where he finished 12th with 2.20 m. The following year, he didn't compete. Back in 2014 at the Commonwealth Games, Ioannou wins the silver medal with a SB of 2.28 m. Derek Drouin of Canada takes gold (2.31 m).

In March 2015, Ioannou makes the final of the European Indoor Athletics Championships but didn't arrived to make any jump due to an injury. In June, he makes the olympic standards by clearing 2.29 m.

In February 2016, for his first competition of the year, the Cypriot equals his own indoor national record made in 2008 (and equaled by Dimitrios Chondrokoukis in 2015) by clearing 2.32 m in Hustopeče on his third try.

International competitions

1No mark in the final

References

External links

Qualifying for the 2004 Olympics

1984 births
Living people
Sportspeople from Limassol
Cypriot male high jumpers
Olympic athletes of Cyprus
Olympic male high jumpers
Athletes (track and field) at the 2004 Summer Olympics
Athletes (track and field) at the 2008 Summer Olympics
Athletes (track and field) at the 2012 Summer Olympics
Athletes (track and field) at the 2016 Summer Olympics
Commonwealth Games silver medallists for Cyprus
Commonwealth Games bronze medallists for Cyprus
Commonwealth Games medallists in athletics
Athletes (track and field) at the 2002 Commonwealth Games
Athletes (track and field) at the 2006 Commonwealth Games
Athletes (track and field) at the 2014 Commonwealth Games
World Athletics Championships athletes for Cyprus
World Athletics Championships medalists
Mediterranean Games gold medalists for Cyprus
Mediterranean Games medalists in athletics
Athletes (track and field) at the 2005 Mediterranean Games
Athletes (track and field) at the 2009 Mediterranean Games
Universiade medalists in athletics (track and field)
Universiade silver medalists for Cyprus
Medallists at the 2006 Commonwealth Games
Medallists at the 2014 Commonwealth Games